Collections is a greatest hits album by Canadian country music artist Charlie Major. It was released by Sony BMG Canada on November 28, 2006.

Track listing
All tracks written by Charlie Major except where noted.
 "The Other Side" - 3:09
 "I'm Gonna Drive You Out of My Mind" (Major, Barry Brown) - 4:08
 "Someday I'm Gonna Ride in a Cadillac" - 3:41
 "I'm Somebody" (Major, Brown) - 3:37
 "I'm Feeling Kind of Lucky Tonight" - 3:41
 "It Can't Happen to Me" - 4:02
 "Nobody Gets Too Much Love" - 3:28
 "Some Days Are Better" - 4:11
 "(I Do It) For the Money" - 3:25
 "This Crazy Heart of Mine" - 4:03

Charlie Major albums
2006 compilation albums